Arissoules Tunnel is a motorway tunnel in the Swiss cantons of Fribourg and Vaud, near the village of Arrissoules. The tunnel forms part of the A1 motorway from Geneva to St. Margrethen.

References

External links
Benoît Stempfel: Le Tunnel d'Arrissoules 
Tunnel des Arrissoules 

Road tunnels in Switzerland
Tunnels completed in 2001